Emmanuel-Louis Gruner (11 May 1809 – 26 March 1883) was a French engineer and geologist.

Life

Emmanuel-Louis Gruner was born on 11 May 1809.

His son, Édouard Gruner, was a prominent civil engineer. In 1869, he was elected as a member of the American Philosophical Society.

Emmanuel-Louis Gruner died on 26 March 1883.

Notes

Sources

1809 births
1883 deaths
École Polytechnique alumni
French engineers
French geologists
People from the canton of Bern